Kakching district (Meitei pronunciation:/kək.ciŋ/) is one of the 16 districts of Manipur state in northeastern India. This district is bounded by Thoubal district on the north, Ukhrul and Chandel districts on the east, Churchandpur and Bishnupur districts on the south and Imphal West and Imphal East districts on the west. The Kakching District is one of the newly form district by the Government of Manipur in 2016 from Thoubal district.

History
On 8 December 2016, this district came into existence when all its administrative units of the erstwhile Kakching sub-division were transferred to form a new district. Later, Kakching District was divided into two sub-divisions namely, Kakching and Waikhong.

Demographics

Kakching has population about
135,481 people according to Census 2011.

Languages

Rivers and lakes
The Sekmai river is the most significant river flow in the district.

Tourism
Kakching Garden is situated at Uyok Ching, in the south of Kakching Bazaar. It is one of the most highly rated gardens in Manipur.

A fishery farm is located in the northern hills of Kakching near the Kakching Lamkhai.

Administrative divisions
The district is divided into two sub-divisions:
 Kakching
 Waikhong

The four Vidhan Sabha constituencies located within the undivided district are Kakching, Hiyanglam, Sugnu and Wabagai.

Kakching is a municipal town and Waikhong, Hiyanglam, and Sugnu are other small towns in the district.

Th.Kirankumar IAS is the first DC of Kakching district appointed by the Government of Manipur on 8 December 2016 and S.Goutam Singh, IPS is the first Superintendent of Police of Kakching district.

Deputy Commissioners 
The first Deputy Commissioner of Kakching was Th. Kirankumar, who assumed office on 8 December 2016 and served until 31 May 2017. The current Deputy Commissioner, Somorjit Salam, took charge in january , 2022.

Post office
Post office of Kakching is situated at Kakching Wairi Labungo Pareng, Kakching District and its PIN Code is 7883241

Police station
Police Station of Kakching is situated at Kakching Chumnang opposite to State Bank of India, Kakching Branch.
SP : Yengkhom Victoria Devi
Adl SP law and order:Thingnam Deshorjit singh
SDPO kakching : Pukhram Shanker Singh

Kakching Excise Station
Kakching Excise Station is located next to SDO office complex.
L.Raghu singh is the superintendent of excise kakching.

See also 
 List of populated places in Kakching district

References

 
Constituencies established in 2016
Districts of Manipur